Lloyd Lamar Blount (April 11, 1920 – August 6, 2007) was an American football end.

Blount was born in Decatur, Mississippi, in 1920 and attended Philadelphia High School. He played college football at Duke and Mississippi State.

He was selected by the New York Giants in the second round (16th overall pick) of the 1944 NFL Draft. He did not play for the Giants. He played in the All-America Football Conference for the Miami Seahawks in 1946 and for the Buffalo Bills and Baltimore Colts in 1947.  He appeared in a total of 22 professional games, nine of them as a starter, and caught 21 passes for 366 yards.

He died in 2007 in Decatur, Mississippi.

References

1920 births
2007 deaths
American football ends
Miami Seahawks players
Duke Blue Devils football players
Mississippi State Bulldogs football players
People from Decatur, Mississippi
Players of American football from Mississippi
Baltimore Colts (1947–1950) players